This list of compositions by Robert Schumann is classified into piano, vocal, orchestral and chamber works. All works are also listed separately, by opus number. Schumann wrote almost exclusively for the piano until 1840, when he burst into song composition around the time of his marriage to Clara Wieck.

Piano works 

 Op. 1, Variations on the name "Abegg" (1830)
 Op. 2, Papillons (1829–1831)
 Op. 3, Études after Paganini Caprices (1832)
 Op. 4, Intermezzi (1832)
 Op. 5, Impromptus [on a Theme by Clara Wieck] (1833)
 Op. 6, Davidsbündlertänze (1837)
 Op. 7, Toccata in C major (1832)
 Op. 8, Allegro in B minor (1831)
 Op. 9, Carnaval (1834–1835)
 Op. 10, 6 Concert Studies on Caprices by Paganini (1833)
 Op. 11, Piano Sonata No. 1 in F-sharp minor (1833-35)
 Op. 12, Fantasiestücke, Op. 12 (Fantasy Pieces) (1837)
 Op. 13, Symphonic Studies (Études symphoniques) (1834)
 Op. 14, Piano Sonata No. 3 in F minor, Concerto Without Orchestra (1836/53)
 Op. 15, Kinderszenen (Scenes From Childhood) (1838)
 Op. 16, Kreisleriana (1838)
 Op. 17, Fantasie in C (1836, revised 1839)
 Op. 18, Arabeske in C (1839)
 Op. 19, Blumenstück (Flower Piece) in D-flat (1839)
 Op. 20, Humoreske in B-flat (1839)
 Op. 21, Novelletten (Novelettes) (1838)
 Op. 22, Piano Sonata No. 2 in G minor (1830–1838)
 Op. 23, Nachtstücke (Night Pieces) (1839)
 Op. 26, Faschingsschwank aus Wien (Carnival Jest from Vienna) (1839)
 Op. 28, Three Romances (1839)
 Op. 32, Four Klavierstücke (Scherzo, Gigue, Romance and Fughette) (1838–9)
 Op. 56, Studies in the Form of Canons for Organ or Pedal Piano (Etuden in kanonischer Form für Orgel oder Pedalklavier) (1845; also known in arrangements for piano trio)
 Op. 58, Sketches for Organ or Pedal Piano (Skizzen für Orgel oder Pedalklavier) (1845)
 Op. 60, 6 Fugues on B–A–C–H for organ or pedal piano (1845)
 Op. 66, Bilder aus Osten (Pictures from the East), 6 Impromptus for piano 4-hands (1848)
 Op. 68, Album for the Young (Album für die Jugend) (1848)
 Op. 72, Four Fugues (Vier Fugen) (1845)
 Op. 76, Four Marches (Vier Märsche) (1849)
 Op. 82, Waldszenen (Forest Scenes) (1848–1849)
 Op. 85, 12 Piano Pieces for Young and Older Children (12 Klavierstücke für kleine und große Kinder) (piano 4 hands) (1849)
 Op. 99, Bunte Blätter ("Coloured Leaves") (1836–1849)
 Op. 109, Ball-Scenen (Scenes from a Ball) (4 hands) (1851)
 Op. 111, Three Fantasiestücke (1851)
 Op. 118, Drei Sonaten für die Jugend (Three Piano Sonatas for the Young) (1853)
 Op. 124, Albumblätter (Album Leaves) (1832–1845) (includes one piece previously part of WoO 31)
 Op. 126, Seven Piano Pieces in Fughetta Form (1853)
 Op. 130, Children's Ball (Kinderball) (four hands) (1853)
 Op. 133, Gesänge der Frühe (Songs of Dawn) (1853)
 WoO 20, Eight Polonaises (four hands) (1828)
 WoO 24, Variations in E-flat on an Original Theme (Geistervariationen) (1854)
 WoO 31, Studies in the Form of Free Variations on a Theme by Beethoven (1831–32)
 Posth., Canon für Alexis
 Posth., Scherzo (rejected from Op. 14) & Presto passionato (original finale of Op. 22)
 Posth., 5 Short Pieces (Notturnino, Ballo, Burla, Capriccio, Écossaise) (nos. 1, 4 & 5 unfinished)
 Posth., Romanza in F major (unfinished)
 Posth., Hasche Mann

Vocal works

Lieder and partsongs 

 Op. 24, Liederkreis (Heine), nine songs (1839)
 Op. 25, Myrthen, twenty-six songs (4 books) (1840)
 Op. 27, Lieder und Gesänge volume I (5 songs) (1840)
 Op. 29, 3 Gedichte (1840)
 Op. 30, 3 Gedichte (1840)
 Op. 31, 3 Gesänge (1840)
 Op. 33, 6 Lieder (part songs for men's voices with piano ad lib) (1840)
 Op. 34, 4 Duets (soprano and tenor with piano) (1840)
 Op. 35, 12 Gedichte (1840)
 Op. 36, 6 Gedichte (1840)
 Op. 37, Gedichte aus "Liebesfrühling" (12 songs, of which numbers 2, 4 and 11 are by Clara Schumann) (1840)
 Op. 39, Liederkreis (Eichendorff), twelve songs (1840)
 Op. 40, 5 Lieder (1840)
 Op. 42, Frauen-Liebe und Leben (Chamisso), eight songs (1840)
 Op. 43, 3 Duets (1840)
 Op. 45, Romanzen & Balladen volume I (3 songs) (1840)
 Op. 48, Song cycle, Dichterliebe, sixteen songs from Heine's Buch der Lieder (1840)
 Op. 49, Romanzen & Balladen volume II (3 songs) (1840)
 Op. 51, Lieder und Gesänge volume II (5 songs) (1842)
 Op. 53, Romanzen & Balladen volume III (3 songs) (1840)
 Op. 55, 5 Lieder (partsongs) (1846)
 Op. 57, Belsatzar, ballad (Heine) (1840)
 Op. 59, 4 Gesänge (partsongs) (1846)
 Op. 62, 3 Gesänge (partsongs with piano ad lib) (1847)
 Op. 64, Romanzen & Balladen volume IV (3 songs) (1841–47)
 Op. 65, Ritornelle in canonischen Weisen (7 canonic part songs) (1847)
 Op. 67, Romanzen & Balladen volume I (5 partsongs for SATB) (1849) (1. "Der König von Thule" (Goethe). 2. "Schön-Rohtraut" (Eduard Mörike). 3. "Heidenröslein" (Goethe). 4. "Ungewitter" (Adelbert von Chamisso). 5. "John Anderson" (Robert Burns, trans. ))
 Op. 69, Romanzen volume I (6 partsongs for women's voices) (1849)
 Op. 74, Spanisches Liederspiel (3 songs, 5 duets, 2 quartets) (1849)
 Op. 75, Romanzen & Balladen volume II (5 partsongs) (1849)
 Op. 77, Lieder und Gesänge volume III (5 songs) (1841–50)
 Op. 78, 4 duets (soprano and tenor) (1849)
 Op. 79, Liederalbum für die Jugend (29 songs) (1849)
 Op. 83, 3 Gesänge (1850)
 Op. 87, Ballad, "Der Handschuh" (Schiller) (1850)
 Op. 89, 6 Gesänge (1850)
 Op. 90, 6 Gedichte  und Requiem (1850)
 Op. 91, Romanzen volume II (6 partsongs for women's voices) (1849)
 Op. 95, 3 Gesänge (1849)
 Op. 96, Lieder und Gesänge volume IV (1850)
 Op. 98a, Songs from Wilhelm Meister
 Op. 101, Minnespiel (4 songs, 2 duets, 2 quartets) (1849)
 Op. 103, Mädchenlieder (2 women's voices and piano) (1851)
 Op. 104, 7 Lieder (1851)
 Op. 106, Declamation with piano, "Schön Hedwig" (1849)
 Op. 107, 6 Gesänge (1851–52)
 Op. 114, 3 Lieder für 3 Frauenstimmen (1853)
 Op. 117, 4 Husarenlieder (1851)
 Op. 119, 3 Gedichte (1851)
 Op. 122, Declamation with piano: "Ballade vom Heideknaben" and "Die Flüchlinge" (1852)
 Op. 125, 5 heitere Gesänge (1851)
 Op. 127, 5 Lieder und Gesänge (1850–51)
 Op. 135, Gedichte der Königin Maria Stuart (1852)
 Op. posth. 137, Jagdlieder (5 partsongs for men's voices with 4 horns ad lib) [1849]
 Op. posth. 138, Spanische Liebeslieder (1849)
 Op. posth. 141, 4 doppelchörige Gesänge (partsongs) (1849)
 Op. posth. 142, 4 Gesänge (1852)
 Op. posth. 145, Romanzen & Balladen Vol. III (5 partsongs) (1849–51)
 Op. posth. 146, Romanzen & Balladen Vol. IV (5 partsongs) (1849)

Choral and dramatic works 

 Op. 50, Das Paradies und die Peri, oratorio (1841–43)
 Op. 71, Adventlied for soprano, chorus and orchestra (1848)
 Op. 81, Genoveva, opera (1848)
 Op. 84, Beim Abschied zu singen for chorus & winds (1848)
 Op. 93, Motet, "Verzweifle nicht im Schmerzenstal" for double chorus and organ ad lib (1849, orchestrated 1852)
 Op. 98b, Requiem for Mignon for solo voices, chorus and orchestra (1849)
 Op. 101, Minnespiel (4 songs, 2 duets, 2 quartets) (1849)
 Op. 108, Nachtlied for chorus and orchestra (1849)
 Op. 112, Der Rose Pilgerfahrt oratorio (1851)
 Op. 115, Overture and incidental music, Manfred (1848–49)
 Op. 116, Der Königssohn (Uhland), for solos, chorus and orchestra (1851)
 Op. 123, Festival overture on the Rheinweinlied for orchestra and chorus (1853)
 Op. posth. 139, "Des Sängers Fluch" (Uhland) for solo voice, chorus and orchestra (1852)
 Op. posth. 140, "Vom Pagen und der Königstochter" for solo voice, chorus, and orchestra (1852)
 Op. posth. 143, "Das Glück von Edenhall" (Uhland) for solo voice, chorus, and orchestra (1853)
 Op. posth. 144, "Neujahrslied" for chorus and orchestra (1849–50)
 Op. posth. 147, Missa sacra (1852)
 Op. posth. 148, Requiem (1852)
 WoO 3, Scenes from Goethe's Faust, oratorio (1844–1853)

Orchestral works

Symphonies

Overtures 
 Op. 52, Overture, Scherzo and Finale in E major (1841)
 Op. 100, The Bride of Messina (1850–51)
 Op. 128, Julius Caesar (1851)
 Op. posth. 136, Hermann and Dorothea (1851)

Works for solo instrument(s) with orchestra 

 Op. 54, Piano Concerto in A minor (1845)
 Op. 86, Konzertstück for Four Horns and Orchestra (1849)
 Op. 92, Introduction and Allegro appassionato for Piano and Orchestra (1849)
 Op. 129, Cello Concerto in A minor (1850)
 Op. 131, Fantasy in C for Violin and Orchestra (1853)
 Op. 134, Concert Allegro with Introduction for Piano and Orchestra (1853)
 WoO 23, Violin Concerto in D minor (1853)

Chamber works 

 Op. 41, Three String Quartets in A minor, F and A (1842)
 Op. 44, Piano Quintet in E-flat (1842)
 Op. 46, Andante and variations for two pianos (1843) (also see WoO 10)
 Op. 47, Piano Quartet in E-flat (1842)
 Op. 63, Piano Trio No. 1 in D minor (1847)
 Op. 70, Adagio and Allegro for Horn and Piano (1849) (Schumann directed that the horn part could also be performed on violin or cello)
 Op. 73, Fantasiestücke for Clarinet and Piano (1849) (Schumann directed that the clarinet part could be also performed on violin or cello)
 Op. 80, Piano Trio No. 2 in F (1847)
 Op. 88, Fantasiestücke for piano trio (1842)
 Op. 94, Three Romances for Oboe and Piano (1849)
 Op. 102, Five Stücke im Volkston for piano and cello (1849), listen
 Op. 105, Violin Sonata No. 1 in A minor (1851)
 Op. 110, Piano Trio No. 3 in G minor (1851)
 Op. 113, Märchenbilder for piano and viola (1851)
 Op. 121, Violin Sonata No. 2 in D minor (1851)
 Op. 132, Märchenerzählungen, four pieces for clarinet, viola and pianoforte (1853)
 WoO 10, Andante and variations for two pianos (original version of Op. 46, arranged for two pianos, 2 cellos and horn)
 WoO 32, Piano quartet in C minor (1829)
 WoO 27, Violin Sonata No. 3 in A minor (1853)

By opus number

Note that Opus 1-23 are all written for piano solo.

 Op. 1, Variations on the name "Abegg" (1830)
 Op. 2, Papillons (1829–1831)
 Op. 3, Etudes After Paganini Caprices (1832)
 Op. 4, Intermezzi (1832)
 Op. 5, Impromptus [on a Theme by Clara Wieck] (1833)
 Op. 6, Davidsbündlertänze (1837)
 Op. 7, Toccata in C major (1832)
 Op. 8, Allegro in B minor (1831)
 Op. 9, Carnaval (1834–1835)
 Op. 10, 6 Concert Studies on Caprices by Paganini (1833)
 Op. 11, Grand Sonata No. 1 in F-sharp minor (1835)
 Op. 12, Fantasiestücke, Op. 12 (Fantasy Pieces) (1837)
 Op. 13, Symphonic Studies (Études symphoniques) (1834)
 Op. 14, Grand Sonata No. 3 in F minor, Concerto Without Orchestra (1835)
 Op. 15, Kinderszenen (Scenes From Childhood) (1838)
 Op. 16, Kreisleriana (1838)
 Op. 17, Fantasie in C (1836, revised 1839)
 Op. 18, Arabeske in C (1839)
 Op. 19, Blumenstück (Flower Piece) in D-flat (1839)
 Op. 20, Humoreske in B-flat (1839)
 Op. 21, Novelletten (Novelettes) (1838)
 Op. 22, Piano Sonata No. 2 in G minor (1833–1835)
 Op. 23, Nachtstücke (Night Pieces) (1839)
 Op. 24, Liederkreis (Heine), nine songs (1840)
 Op. 25, Myrthen, twenty-six songs (4 books) (1840)
 Op. 26, Faschingsschwank aus Wien (Carnival Jest from Vienna) (1839), for piano
 Op. 27, Lieder und Gesänge volume I (5 songs) (1840)
 Op. 28, Three Romances (1839) for piano
 Op. 29, 3 Gedichte (1840)
 Op. 30, 3 Gedichte (1840)
 Op. 31, 3 Gesänge (1840)
 Op. 32, 4 Klavierstücke (Scherzo, Gigue, Romance and Fughette) (1838–9)
 Op. 33, 6 Lieder (part songs for men's voices with piano ad lib) (1840)
 Op. 34, 4 Duets (soprano and tenor with piano) (1840)
 Op. 35, 12 Gedichte (1840)
 Op. 36, 6 Gedichte (1840)
 Op. 37, Gedichte aus "Liebesfrühling" (12 songs, of which numbers 2, 4 and 11 are by Clara Schumann) (1841)
 Op. 38, Symphony No. 1 in B-flat, Spring (1841)
 Op. 39, Liederkreis (Eichendorff), twelve songs (1840)
 Op. 40, 5 Lieder (1840)
 Op. 41, Three String Quartets in A minor, F and A (1842)
 Op. 42, Frauenliebe und -leben (Chamisso), eight songs (1840)
 Op. 43, 3 Duets (1840)
 Op. 44, Piano Quintet in E-flat (1842)
 Op. 45, Romanzen & Balladen volume I (3 songs) (1840)
 Op. 46, Andante and variations for two pianos (1843) (also see WoO 10)
 Op. 47, Piano Quartet in E-flat (1842)
 Op. 48, Song cycle, Dichterliebe, sixteen songs from Heine's Buch der Lieder (1840)
 Op. 49, Romanzen & Balladen volume II (3 songs) (1840)
 Op. 50, Das Paradies und die Peri, oratorio (1841–43)
 Op. 51, Lieder und Gesänge volume II (5 songs) (1842)
 Op. 52, Overture, Scherzo and Finale in E (1841)
 Op. 53, Romanzen & Balladen volume III (3 songs) (1840)
 Op. 54, Piano Concerto in A minor (1841–45)
 Op. 55, 5 Lieder (partsongs) (1846)
 Op. 56, Studies in the Form of Canons for Organ or Pedal Piano (Etuden in kanonischer Form für Orgel oder Pedalklavier) (1845)
 Op. 57, Belsatzar, ballad (Heine) (1840)
 Op. 58, Sketches for Organ or Pedal Piano (Skizzen für Orgel oder Pedalklavier) (1845)
 Op. 59, 4 Gesänge (partsongs) (1846)
 Op. 60, 6 Fugues on B–A–C–H for organ or pedal piano (1845)
 Op. 61, Symphony No. 2 in C (1845–46)
 Op. 62, 3 Gesänge (partsongs with piano ad lib) (1847)
 Op. 63, Piano Trio No. 1 in D minor (1847)
 Op. 64, Romanzen & Balladen volume IV (3 songs) (1841–47)
 Op. 65, Ritornelle in canonischen Weisen (7 canonic part songs) (1847)
 Op. 66, Bilder aus Osten (Pictures from the East), 6 Impromptus for piano 4-hands (1848)
 Op. 67, Romanzen & Balladen volume I (5 partsongs) (1849)
 Op. 68, Album for the Young (Album für die Jugend) (1848) for piano
 Op. 69, Romanzen volume I (6 partsongs for women's voices) (1849)
 Op. 70, Adagio and Allegro for Horn and Piano (1849) (Schumann directed that the horn part could also be performed on violin or cello)
 Op. 71, Adventlied for soprano, chorus and orchestra (1848)
 Op. 72, Four Fugues (Vier Fugen) (1845) for piano
 Op. 73, Fantasiestücke for Clarinet and Piano (1849) (Schumann directed that the clarinet part could be also performed on violin or cello)
 Op. 74, Spanisches Liederspiel (3 songs, 5 duets, 2 quartets) (1849)
 Op. 75, Romanzen & Balladen volume II (5 partsongs) (1849)
 Op. 76, Four Marches (Vier Märsche) (1849) for piano
 Op. 77, Lieder und Gesänge volume III (5 songs) (1841–50)
 Op. 78, 4 duets (soprano and tenor) (1849)
 Op. 79, Liederalbum für die Jugend (29 songs) (1849)
 Op. 80, Piano Trio No. 2 in F (1847)
 Op. 81, Genoveva, opera (1848)
 Op. 82, Waldszenen (Forest Scenes) (1848–1849) for piano
 Op. 83, 3 Gesänge (1850)
 Op. 84, Beim Abschied zu singen for chorus & winds (1848)
 Op. 85, 12 Piano Pieces for Young and Older Children (12 Klavierstücke für kleine und große Kinder) (piano 4 hands) (1849)
 Op. 86, Konzertstück for Four Horns and Orchestra (1849)
 Op. 87, Ballad, "Der Handschuh" (Schiller) (1850)
 Op. 88, Fantasiestücke for piano trio (1842)
 Op. 89, 6 Gesänge (1850)
 Op. 90, 6 Gedichte und Requiem (1850)
 Op. 91, Romanzen volume II (6 partsongs for women's voices) (1849)
 Op. 92, Introduction and Allegro Appassionato for Piano and Orchestra (1849)
 Op. 93, Motet, "Verzweifle nicht im Schmerzenstal" for double chorus and organ ad lib (1849, orchestrated 1852)
 Op. 94, Three Romances for Oboe and Piano (1849)
 Op. 95, 3 Gesänge (1849)
 Op. 96, Lieder und Gesänge volume IV (1850)
 Op. 97, Symphony No. 3 in E-flat, Rhenish (1850)
 Op. 98a, Songs from Wilhelm Meister
 Op. 98b, Requiem for Mignon for solo voices, chorus and orchestra (1849)
 Op. 99, Bunte Blätter (1836–1849) for piano
 Op. 100, The Bride of Messina overture (1850–51)
 Op. 101, Minnespiel (4 songs, 2 duets, 2 quartets) (1849)
 Op. 102, Five Stücke im Volkston for piano and cello (1849)
 Op. 103, Mädchenlieder (2 women's voices and piano) (1851)
 Op. 104, 7 Lieder (1851)
 Op. 105, Violin Sonata No. 1 in A minor (1851)
 Op. 106, Declamation with piano, "Schön Hedwig" (1849)
 Op. 107, 6 Gesänge (1851–52)
 Op. 108, Nachtlied for chorus and orchestra (1849)
 Op. 109, Ball-Scenen (Scenes from a Ball) (piano 4 hands) (1851)
 Op. 110, Piano Trio No. 3 in G minor (1851)
 Op. 111, Three Fantasiestücke (1851) for piano
 Op. 112, Der Rose Pilgerfahrt oratorio (1851)
 Op. 113, Märchenbilder for piano and viola (1851)
 Op. 114, 3 Lieder für 3 Frauenstimmen (1853)
 Op. 115, Overture and incidental music, Manfred (1848–49)
 Op. 116, Der Königssohn (Uhland), for solos, chorus and orchestra (1851)
 Op. 117, 4 Husarenlieder (1851)
 Op. 118, Drei Sonaten für die Jugend (Three Piano Sonatas for the Young) (1853)
 Op. 119, 3 Gedichte (1851)
 Op. 120, Symphony No. 4 in D minor (1841; revised in 1851)
 Op. 121, Violin Sonata No. 2 in D minor (1851)
 Op. 122, Declamation with piano: "Ballade vom Heideknaben" and "Die Flüchlinge" (1852)
 Op. 123, Festival overture on the Rheinweinlied for orchestra and chorus (1853)
 Op. 124, Albumblätter (Album Leaves) (1832–1845) (includes one piece previously part of WoO 31)
 Op. 125, 5 heitere Gesänge (1851)
 Op. 126, Seven Piano Pieces in Fughetta Form (1853)
 Op. 127, 5 Lieder und Gesänge (1850–51)
 Op. 128, Julius Caesar overture (1851)
 Op. 129, Cello Concerto in A minor (1850)
 Op. 130, Children's Ball (Kinderball) (four hands) (1853)
 Op. 131, Fantasy in C for violin and orchestra (1853)
 Op. 132, Märchenerzählungen, four pieces for clarinet, viola and pianoforte (probably 1853)
 Op. 133, Songs of Dawn (Gesänge der Frühe) (1853) for piano
 Op. 134, Introduction and Allegro for Piano and Orchestra (1853)
 Op. 135, Gedichte der Königin Maria Stuart (1852)
 Op. posth. 136, Hermann und Dorothea overture (1851)
 Op. posth. 137, Jagdlieder (5 partsongs for men's voices with 4 horns ad lib) [1849]
 Op. posth. 138, Spanische Liebeslieder (1849)
 Op. posth. 139, "Des Sängers Fluch" (Uhland) for solo voice, chorus and orchestra (1852)
 Op. posth. 140, "Vom Pagen und der Königstochter" for solo voice, chorus, and orchestra (1852)
 Op. posth. 141, 4 doppelchörige Gesänge (partsongs) (1849)
 Op. posth. 142, 4 Gesänge (1852)
 Op. posth. 143, "Das Glück von Edenhall" (Uhland) for solo voice, chorus, and orchestra (1853)
 Op. posth. 144, "Neujahrslied" for chorus and orchestra (1849–50)
 Op. posth. 145, Romanzen & Balladen Vol. III (5 partsongs) (1849–51)
 Op. posth. 146, Romanzen & Balladen Vol. IV (5 partsongs) (1849)
 Op. posth. 147, Missa sacra (1852)
 Op. posth. 148, Requiem (1852)

References

Further reading

 Margit L. McCorkle, Robert Schumann: Thematisch-Bibliographisches Werkverzeichnis [Thematic Bibliographical Catalogue], Munich: G. Henle Verlag, 2003. 1130 pages .

 
Schumann, Robert

de:Robert Schumann#Werke